MV Peveril was a ro-ro cargo ferry operated in the Irish Sea, initially by P&O Ferries and then Sealink. As NF Jaguar and then Peveril, between 1981 and 1998 she was operated by the Isle of Man Steam Packet Company from Douglas, Isle of Man.

History
Built in 1971 as MV Holmia by Kristiansands Mekaniske Verksted, Norway for Silja Line, Finland, she was operated as ADS Meteor
and then Pendaby by P&O Ferries between Heysham and Belfast from February 1973.

From May 1981, NF Jaguar (the NF denoting Normandy Ferries) was on bareboat charter to the Isle of Man Steam Packet Company operating between Douglas and Heysham in rivalry to the Manx Line, . The company purchased her in December 1982 and renamed her Peveril.

Competition from the rival  Manx Line led to the financial collapse of the Isle of Man Steam Packet Company and its subsequent amalgamation with Sealink-Manx Line. From 1 April 1985, the main UK port was to move from Liverpool to Heysham, severing connections with Liverpool after 155 years. Twelve shore staff staged a sit-in at Liverpool trapping the Peveril. She was only released on 8 April after redundancy payments totalling almost a quarter of a million pounds were agreed, adding to the costs of withdrawing from Liverpool. She continued on the route until 10 July 1998.

In September 2000, she was sold to Marine Express Inc., Panama. As Caribbean Express, she left Birkenhead on 27 September. A few days, later she suffered an engine failure in the Bay of Biscay and required repair in Santander, Spain.

In 2002, she was detained in Sotchi, Russia.

Latterly under Cambodian flag, she was sold to Indian breakers and was scrapped in April 2009.

Footnotes

1971 ships
Ships built in Kristiansand
Ferries of the Isle of Man
Ships of the Isle of Man Steam Packet Company
Merchant ships of the Isle of Man